Buses in Dunedin, New Zealand are the primary form of public transport. The Otago Regional Council designs routes and schedules and contracts operation of bus services to two bus companies, Go Bus Transport and Ritchies Transport. Services operate daily at mainly 15 to 30-minute headways; services on evenings, weekends and holidays at about half the weekday frequency and there are no services on late Sunday or holiday evenings, nor on Christmas Day, Good Friday or Easter Sunday.

Bus fares are paid for by cash or by the electronic ticketing system Bee Card. The Bee Card replaced GoCards on 1 September 2020. Prior to GoCards, multi-trip paper tickets were used until November 2007. 

The service carries 2.2 million passengers per year

Routes
Most routes are cross-city routes via the city centre. Longer-distance routes terminate in the centre. Semi-orbital route 15 Ridge Runner links most inner suburbs but avoids the centre. The Mosgiel 77 semi-express service has a branch route 70 connecting at Green Island and a figure-8-shaped 80/81 Mosgiel Loop connecting on Mosgiel's main street, Gordon Rd. Transferring between routes, historically not a feature of Dunedin bus services, is more favourable under the current fare regime.

{| class="wikitable"
|-
! !! Route number (or destination number) !! Outer terminus !! via !! City stop !! via !! Outer terminus !! Bus operator
|-
| style='background: #ABDCD4' | || 1 || Palmerston || Waikouaiti, Karitane, Waitati, Dunedin-Waitati Highway || Cumberland St (Centre City New World) || – || – || Ritchies
|-
| style='background: #FFFF00' | || 3 || Ross Creek || Glenleith, George Street || Octagon || South Dunedin, Tainui || Ocean Grove || Go Bus
|-
| style='background: #CCBF34' | || 5/6 || Pine Hill || Gardens, George Street || Octagon || Caversham || Lookout Point || Ritchies
|-
| style='background: #ED1C24' | || 8 || Normanby || Gardens, George Street || Octagon || Cargill's Corner, South Dunedin || St Clair || Go Bus
|-
| style='background: #009E4D' | ||  10/11 || Opoho || Gardens, George Street || Octagon || South Dunedin, Musselburgh || Shiel Hill || Ritchies
|-
| style='background: #CFAE78' | || 14 || Port Chalmers (Harrington Street) || Careys Bay, Port Chalmers, Sawyers Bay, Roseneath, St Leonards, Burkes, Ravensbourne, Logan Park, University, George Street, Octagon (inbound) || Cumberland St (Countdown) || – || -|| Ritchies
|-
| style='background: #55758D' | || 15 "Ridge Rider" (semi-orbital route) || University (Forth St) || Gardens, North Dunedin, Maori Hill, Roslyn, Mornington, || – || – || South Dunedin (Andersons Bay Rd) || Ritchies
|-
| style='background: #A1F078' | || 18 || Portobello || Edwards Bay, Turnbulls Bay, Broad Bay, Company Bay, Macandrew Bay, The Cove, Exchange || Cumberland St (Centre City New World) || – || – || Ritchies
|-
| style='background: #EE3E96' | || 19 || Waverley || Musselburgh, South Dunedin, Exchange || Cumberland St (Centre City New World) and Octagon || City Rise || Belleknowes || Go Bus
|-
| style='background: #D48189' | || 33 || Corstorphine || Caversham, Cargill's Corner || Octagon || City Rise, Roslyn, Kaikorai || Wakari || Go Bus
|-
| style='background: #D9581E' | || 37/38 || Concord (38) || Kenmure, Bradford, Kaikorai, Moana Pool || George St (northbound); Octagon (southbound) || Otago Museum || University (Forth St) (37) || Ritchies
|-
| style='background: #65A2A2' | || 44 || St Kilda || Cargill's Corner, Exchange || Octagon || Kaikorai || Halfway Bush, New Zealand|| Go Bus
|-
| style='background: #00AEEF' | || 50 || Helensburgh || Balmacewen, Maori Hill, City Rise || Octagon || Cargill's Corner, Kew, St Clair Park || Corstorphine || Go Bus
|-
| style='background: #F391BC' | || 55 || St Kilda || Cargill's Corner, Exchange || Octagon || Kaikorai || Brockville || Go Bus
|-
| style='background: #9DC435' | || 61 || Kenmure || Mornington, Exchange || Cumberland St (Centre City New World) || – || – || Go Bus
|-
| style='background: #B369AB' | || 63 || Balaclava || Mornington, Exchange || Octagon || Otago Museum, University || Logan Park || Ritchies
|-
| style='background: #A1D9F7' | || 70 || Brighton || Ocean View, Waldronville, Abbotsford || – || – || Green Island (transfer to/from route 77) || Go Bus
|-
| style='background: #F59C00' | || 77 (semi-express) || Mosgiel Centre Street || Gordon Rd, Fairfield, Sunnyvale, Green Island (transfer to/from route 70), Dunedin Southern Motorway, Exchange || Cumberland St (Centre City New World) ||  – || – || Go Bus
|-
| style='background: #55758D' | || 80 || – || Mosgiel Loop east circuit || – ||  – || – || Go Bus
|-
| style='background: #55758D' | || 81 || – || Mosgiel Loop west circuit || – ||  – || – || Go Bus
|}

 All routes use wheelchair-accessible buses
 All routes use buses fitted with bike racks

Organising bus routes in Dunedin
Dunedin's bus network is designed and managed by the Otago Regional Council. Fares are levied to cover about half of operating cost with the balance subsidised by Otago Regional Council ratepayers (about a quarter) and New Zealand Transport Agency (the remaining quarter; funded by fuel tax and road user charges). Buses use the individual companies' livery with Otago Regional Council stickers added. Until 2015, all services operated under the brand Gobus''; this ended when a bus company with a similar name began serving the city. The regional council intends to introduce a new brand Orbus''' to the network Safety standards are regulated by the NZ Transport Agency (NZTA). The Dunedin City Council has no administrative role other than as provider of the road infrastructure (with the exception of State Highways, for which NZTA is the provider), street furniture such as signs and seats and regulation of parking at bus stops. However, the city council is involved in discussions with the regional council over taking over the management of public transport.

History 
The Dunedin City Council operated and managed most public transport until 1986 including the Dunedin cable tramway system (similar to the famous San Francisco cable cars) between 1881 and 1957, electric trams from 1900 to 1956, trolleybuses from 1950 to 1982 and motor buses from 22 April 1925 to 1986. From 1986, management of bus services became the responsibility of the Otago Regional Council; the city council continued as a contracted operator of many services through its subsidiary Citibus.

New Zealand Railways (NZR) operated commuter trains from the Dunedin railway station to Port Chalmers and to Wingatui and Mosgiel until 1979 and 1982, respectively. Reintroduction of rail services is suggested from time to time NZR, through its Road Services division, from 1985 known as Cityline, also operated motor buses to the suburbs of Warrington, Cherry Farm, Brighton, Outram and Mosgiel until Cityline was privatised in 1991 – the Dunedin fleet was sold to Newtons Coachways. All the above-mentioned train or bus routes except Warrington and Outram continue to be served by the present bus system.

In early times, there were ferries connecting the central city to Port Chalmers and Portobello, but these ceased between the 1930s and 2018 as road connections along the harbour's edge were improved.

Former privately owned public transport operators in Dunedin included Turnbulls (Dunedin to Portobello); Newtons (Dunedin to Waverley), Otago Road Services (Dunedin to Green Island, Abbotsford and Fairfield), all of whom operated services over several decades from the 1950s to the 1980s and 1990s. From the late 1980s onwards, Cesta Travel (later called Southeastern) and Dunedin Passenger Transport operated a wide range of routes on various short-term contracts.

In late January 2020, the Dunedin City Council voted to reduce bus fares while exploring the re-establishment of a commuter rail link between Mosgiel and the Dunedin city centre. This includes allocating $600,000 to bus subsidies.

Airport buses

There are no conventional airport bus services to Dunedin Airport: this airport is served by a large fleet of shuttle vans provided by several operators including most of the local taxi companies. Airport shuttle vans typically stop several times en route to pick up or let off booked passengers.

Notes

References

External links
Otago Regional Council

Bus transport in New Zealand
Transport in Dunedin